The 6th South Indian International Movie Awards is an awards event held at Abu Dhabi National Exhibition Centre, Abu Dhabi on 30 June and 1 July 2017. SIIMA 2017 will recognize the best films and performances from the past year, along with special honors for lifetime contributions and a few special awards. The nomination list for the main awards was announced in June 2017.

Honorary awards

Lifetime Achievement Award 
 Murali Mohan
 S. P. Balasubrahmanyam

Special appreciation 
 Mohan Babu for completing 40 years in Telugu Film industry.

Main awards winners and nominees

Film

Acting

Debut awards

Music

Critics' choice
Tamil Cinema
Best Actor - R. Madhavan - Irudhi Suttru
Best Actress - Varalaxmi Sarathkumar - Tharai Thappattai
Telugu Cinema
Best Actor – Nani – Krishna Gaadi Veera Prema Gaadha
Best Actress - 
Kannada Cinema
Best Actor - Rakshith Shetty - Kirik Party 
Best Actress - Parul Yadav - Killing Veerappan
Malayalam Cinema
Best Actor - Nivin Pauly
Best Actress - Asha Sarath

Generation Best Awards

 Entertainer of the Year :
 Vijay for Theri 
 Rakshit Shetty for Kirik Party
Generation Next Superstar – Baby Nainika for Theri

References

External links
 Official website

South Indian International Movie Awards
2017 Indian film awards